Shohadaye Mes Kerman Stadium, is a football stadium located in the Kerman, Iran. It is owned by Kerman's copper industries, and currently is used by Mes Kerman.

References

Football venues in Iran